Jack Dale Kiser (born February 4, 1949) is a former American football coach.  He was the 16th head football coach at Abilene Christian University in Abilene, Texas, serving for four seasons, from 1996 to 1999, and compiling a record of 21–20.

Coaching career
In 1986, Kiser was hired as an assistant coach at Texas Tech University by head football coach David McWilliams. He left Texas Tech after the 1986 season when McWilliams was named the head football coach at the University of Texas at Austin, and served as a defensive assistant there from 1987 to 1991. In 1992, Kiser became defensive coordinator at Southwest Texas State University.

Head coaching record

References

1949 births
Living people
American football defensive tackles
Abilene Christian Wildcats football coaches
Abilene Christian Wildcats football players
Texas Longhorns football coaches
Texas State Bobcats football coaches
Texas Tech Red Raiders football coaches
Sportspeople from Abilene, Texas
Coaches of American football from Texas
Players of American football from Texas